Andrés Arauz Galarza (born 6 February 1985) is an Ecuadorian politician and economist. Arauz served as Minister of Knowledge and Human Talent in the Rafael Correa administration from 2015 to 2017. He also briefly served as President of the Citizen Revolution Movement from five months between December 2020 to May 2021.

Arauz was a candidate for President of Ecuador in the 2021 general election as a progressive candidate. He came in first place in the first round of voting, however narrowly lost in the run-off election to Conservative banker Guillermo Lasso.

Background 
Andrés Arauz started his career as a public servant in 2009 at the Central Bank of Ecuador. He was general director of banking at the Central Bank from 2011 to 2013. He was later appointed deputy minister of planning and general director of national procurement.  In March 2015, he was appointed Minister of Knowledge and Human Talent in the government of Rafael Correa, replacing Guillaume Long. From this position he led the coordination and supervision of the execution of the politics, programs, and projects of the Ministries of Education, Culture, Higher Education, Science, and Technology. Among the outcomes of these projects were improved technological independence in the country, the use of free software, and the development of free knowledge.

He also headed the Ministry of Culture for a brief period of time due to the resignation of Raúl Vallejo.

In 2017, when Lenín Moreno became president, Arauz turned to an academic career, co-founding the Observatory of Dollarization dedicated to disseminating essays and investigations  on the subject of dollarization of various national economies and its effects.  He also began doctoral studies on financial economics at the National Autonomous University of Mexico. He is a member of the Executive Council of International Progress.

He is a member of the Executive Council of the Progressive International.

Political career

2021 presidential candidacy 
Allies of former president Rafael Correa were prevented from registering a new political party after Moreno became president.

On 18 August 2020, UNES announced Arauz as its candidate for President of Ecuador in the elections scheduled for 7 February 2021. Accompanying Arauz as running mate would have been Rafael Correa, who had been president from 2007 to 2017. However, his acceptance of the position was rejected by the National Electoral Council, which argued that it was mere procedure rather than politically motivated, as Correa, who resided in Belgium, refused to return to the country and serve an 8-year prison sentence for corruption. The courts barred Correa from holding a political position for 25 years.

Arauz won the first round of the presidential election with almost 33% of votes. He faced banker Guillermo Lasso in the runoff on 11 April. On the eve of the run-off, Arauz was slightly ahead of candidate Lasso in opinion polls, leading by a margin of 1% of 50% against Lasso's 49%. Lasso defeated Arauz in the run-off.

Notes

References

1985 births
Living people
21st-century Ecuadorian economists
Government ministers of Ecuador
National Autonomous University of Mexico alumni
People from Quito
University of Michigan alumni